In enzymology, an allantoate deiminase is an enzyme that catalyzes the chemical reaction

allantoate + H2O  ureidoglycine + NH3 + CO2

Thus, the two substrates of this enzyme are allantoate and H2O, whereas its 3 products are ureidoglycine, NH3, and CO2.

This enzyme belongs to the family of hydrolases, those acting on carbon-nitrogen bonds other than peptide bonds, specifically in linear amidines.  The systematic name of this enzyme class is allantoate amidinohydrolase (decarboxylating). This enzyme is also called allantoate amidohydrolase.  This enzyme participates in purine metabolism.

References 

 

EC 3.5.3
Enzymes of unknown structure